Lancia is a genus of moths of the family Crambidae. It contains only one species, Lancia phrontisalis, which is found in Brazil (Rio de Janeiro).

References

Taxa named by Francis Walker (entomologist)
Moths described in 1859